"Undo It" is a song written by Carrie Underwood, Kara DioGuardi, Marti Frederiksen, and Luke Laird. It was made available to digital retailers on October 27, 2009, and was released as an official single on May 24, 2010. The song is the third single from Underwood's third studio album, Play On.

Underwood performed the song at the 2010 American Idol finale, as well as at the 2010 CMT Music Awards. "Undo It" has sold 1.6 million copies in the United States, making it the 7th biggest song of her career. It was also her first song to chart in Australia, peaking at Number 85.

"Undo It" was ranked number 29 on Billboard's year-end charts for Top Country Songs.

Content

Underwood told The Boot that the idea for the "Undo It" hook came accidentally. "The guys had their guitars and they were playing something kind of bluesy, and Kara's got such a great R&B sense about her," she said. "And I started, 'Na, na, na-ing' to whatever they were playing. And they were like, 'What if that was the hook?' I said, 'Aw, I don't know?' And before you knew it, we had 'Uh, uh, uh undo it.' I mean, who would have thought? How do you write that down on paper? It was something that it didn't take that long to write and it's so much fun to sing on stage, and people get into it."

Critical reception
The song has received generally mixed reviews from music critics. Juli Thanki of Engine 145 gave the song a thumbs-down, calling it "a third-rate tune from Kelly Clarkson’s reject pile" and saying that it had "deeply stupid lyrics." Roughstock critic Matt Bjorke rated the song two-and-a-half stars out of five, saying that it had "catchy repeatable lyrics" but concluded his review by saying "she can do so much better." In his review for Allmusic, Stephen Thomas Erlewine called the song "strained sassiness." Billboard critic Deborah Evans Price was more positive in her review, comparing it to the "vengeful Carrie persona" of "Before He Cheats" and saying that it had "crisp, compelling" production. Kevin John Coyne of Country Universe gave the song an A− calling Undo It a short, sweet, and undeniably catchy song which features both “We Will Rock You” drum riffs and twangy fiddle, as if those two things together are as natural as peanut butter and chocolate.

Music video
CMT premiered the video for "Undo It" on May 7, 2010.  The video features shots of Underwood performing the song in concert along with shots of the background video played during the performance of the song in the Play On Tour. The video was directed by Chris Hicky. It was filmed on April 6, 2010, at the Columbus, Ohio concert.

Live Performances 
Underwood performed the song live for American Idol's season finale on Wednesday, May 26. She again performed it for the Today show on Friday, July 30. She performed it live for the 2010 CMT Music Awards on June 9, 2010. She included it for a hits medley during the 2010 CMT Artists of the Year special, airing on December 3.

Chart performance
"Undo It" debuted at number 43 on the U.S. Billboard Hot Country Songs chart for the week of May 1, 2010. The song hit number one for the week of August 7, 2010, giving Underwood her tenth number one on this chart. The song debuted at number 86 on the U.S. Billboard Hot 100 before the release of her album Play On, and re-entered the chart at number 95 following its release as an official single. After performing the song on the finale of American Idol, the song rose to a new peak of number 25, becoming the second most successful single from Play On. It then rose to number 23 after performing it at the 2010 CMT Music Awards. The song became her eleventh Top 40 Hot 100 hit. The song re-entered once again at number 67 and stayed there for five more weeks before it dropped off the chart. On the week of June 27, 2011, "Undo It" entered the Australian Singles Chart at number 85, becoming her first entrance to the chart in her career.

As of October 2015, "Undo It" has sold 1,600,000 copies in the United States.

Weekly charts

Year-end charts

Release history

Awards and nominations

2010 Teen Choice Awards

|-
| align="center"|2010 ||align="center"| "Undo It" ||align="center"| Choice Country Song ||

2010 CMA Triple-Play Awards

|-
| align="center"|2010 ||align="center"| "Undo It" ||align="center"| Triple-Play Songwriter (along with "Cowboy Casanova" and "Temporary Home") ||

2011 CMT Music Awards

|-
| align="center"|2011 ||align="center"| "Undo It" ||align="center"| Video of the Year || 
|-
| align="center"|2011 ||align="center"| "Undo It" ||align="center"| Female Video of the Year ||

2011 BMI Awards

|-
| align="center"|2011 ||align="center"| "Undo It" ||align="center"| Songwriter of the Year ||

Sales and certification
As a promotional single (before the release of Play On):

United States: 28,000

As a confirmed single (after the release of Play On):

United States: 1,600,000

The song has officially been certified 2× Platinum by the RIAA.

References 

Carrie Underwood songs
Songs written by Carrie Underwood
Songs written by Kara DioGuardi
Arista Nashville singles
Songs written by Luke Laird
Music videos directed by Chris Hicky
Song recordings produced by Mark Bright (record producer)
2009 songs
Songs written by Marti Frederiksen
2010 singles